Tusen eldar is a 1988 studio album by Freda', released to LP, cassette tape. and CD. The album was rereleased to CD in 2008.

For the album, the band was given a Grammis Award in the category "Religious Music of the Year", but Freda' stated that they didn't play any such music, even if the bandmembers earlier in their career had described themselves as religious.

Track listing
All songs written by Uno Svenningsson & Arne Johansson (except track 1: U. Svenningsson/
A. Johansson/M. Johansson) and (track 2: U. Svenningsson/
A. Johansson/D. Sundqvist)
 Jag vill se dig lycklig
 I en annan del av världen
 Nu är stormen över
 Dansar i natten
 Tusen eldar
 Jag kan se dig
 Det måste gå
 Månen i min spegel
 Bara ett barn
 Alltid där
 Skrattet mitt i gråten (CD only)
 Glädjetåg (CD only)

Contributors 
Uno Svenningsson - vocals, guitar
Arne Johansson - guitar
Sam Johansson - keyboard
Mats Johansson - drums
guest bassists

Charts

References 

1988 albums
Freda' albums
Swedish-language albums